Wohlfahrtiimonas populi is a Gram-negative, facultatively anaerobic and motile bacterium from the genus of Wohlfahrtiimonas which has been isolated from tree Populus × euramericana.

References

Gammaproteobacteria
Bacteria described in 2017